Kharavela (also transliterated Khārabēḷa) was a monarch of Kalinga in present-day Odisha, India, who ruled during the second or first century BCE. The primary source for Kharavela is his rock-cut Hathigumpha inscription. The inscription is undated, only four of its 17 lines are completely legible, others unclear, variously interpreted and disputed by scholars. The inscription written with Jainism-related phrases recites a year by year record of his reign and panegyrically credits him with public infrastructure projects, welfare activities, patronage of the arts, and many military victories. Historians agree that it is best and most complete biography of Kharavela available. He was a follower of Jainism.

Background

Sources 

Much of the available information about Kharavela comes from the undated, much damaged Hathigumpha inscription and several minor inscriptions found in the Udayagiri and Khandagiri Caves in present-day Odisha. The Hathigumpha inscription records Kharavela's life until his 38th year, including 13 years of his reign. The inscription is badly damaged; of its 17 lines, only four are completely legible, the rest partly lost and eroded by natural processes. It is open to "widely different" interpretations, giving rise to disputes and speculation by various scholars.

Date 
The kingdom of Kalinga was annexed by Ashoka c. 262-261 BCE. The Hathigumpha inscription implies that Kalinga regained its independence from the Maurya Empire sometime after Ashoka's death, and Kharavela was born in an independent Kalinga.

In 1885, the colonial era eipgraphist Bhagwan Lal Indraji read the 16th line of the Hathigumpha inscription as a reference to Maurya kala and 165th year after this new timeline, which he called the Mauryan era. Indraji concluded that Kharavela was born in 127 BCE and became king in 103 BCE. Indraji's interpretations were questioned by scholars and has been largely rejected.

According to Sudhakar Chattopadhyaya, the 16th line does not mention Maurya kala ("Maurya era") but reads Mukhya kala ("the main era"). Chattopadhyaya relies on the description of Kharavela's fifth regnal year in the Hathigumpha inscription, which he says implies that Kharavela flourished ti-vasa-sata years after the Nandaraja. Hem Chandra Raychaudhuri identifies Nandaraja with Mahapadma Nanda or one of his sons. The expression ti-vasa-sata can mean 103 or 300 years; Chattopadhyaya does not consider 103 plausible, since it would contradict Ashoka's records. Based on this, he places Kharavela in the second half of the first century BCE or the first half of the first century CE.

Depending on the variant readings, different dates continue to be published in post-colonial era texts. Alain Daniélou, for example, places Kharavela between 180 BCE and 130 BCE, identifying him as a contemporary of Satakarni and Pushyamitra Shunga. According to Rama Shankar Tripathi, Kharavela reigned during the third quarter of the first century BCE. Many other scholars, such as D.C. Sircar and Walter Spink, date Kharavela and the Hathigumpha inscription in the 1st-century BCE to early 1st-century CE.

Dynasty 
The first line of the Hathigumpha inscription calls Kharavela "Chetaraja-vasa-vadhanena" (चेतराज वस वधनेन, "the one who extended the family of the Cheta King"). R. D. Banerji and D. C. Sircar interpreted "Cheti" (चेति) to be referring to a dynasty from which Kharavela descended, namely Chedi mahajanapada. According to Sahu, this is incorrect and an artifact of a crack in the stone. The "Chetaraja", states Sahu, probably refers to Kharavela's father and his immediate predecessor.

The Hathigumpha inscription also contains a word that has been interpreted as Aira or Aila. According to a small inscription found in the Mancapuri Cave, Kharavela's successor Kudepasiri also styled himself as Aira Maharaja Kalingadhipati Mahameghavahana (Devanagari: ऐर महाराजा कलिंगाधिपतिना महामेघवाहन). Early readings of that inscription by scholars such as James Prinsep and R. L. Mitra interpreted Aira as the name of the king in the Hathigumpha inscription. Indraji's work corrected this error, and established that the king mentioned in the Hathugumpha inscription was Kharavela and that he was a descendant of Mahameghavahana.  It does not directly mention the relationship between Mahameghavahana and Kharavela, or the number of kings between them. Indraji interpreted the inscription to create a hypothetical family tree in 1885, but this is largely discredited.

The word Aira or Aila was then re-interpreted, by Barua and Sahu  to be the Prakrit form of the Sanskrit word Arya ("noble"). Jayaswal and Banerji interpret the same word to be referring to the Aila dynasty, the mythical Pururavas dynasty mentioned in Hindu and Jain texts; Kharavela's Mahameghavahana family might have claimed descent from this Pururavas dynasty. Scholars such as Sircar and Sharma, based on later discovered Guntupalli inscriptions, state that Kharavela was one of the ancient Mahameghavahana dynasty king from Kalinga.

Name 
Suniti Kumar Chatterji interpreted "Kharavela" as a name of Dravidian origin, possibly derived from the words kar ("black and terrible") and vel ("lance"). Richard N. Frye, however, did not find Chatterji's etymology satisfactory. According to Braj Nath Puri, it is difficult to suggest a Dravidian cultural origin for Kharavela's dynasty or connect it to South India with certainty. N. K. Sahu also doubts this theory, where he interprets "Aira" or "Aila" word in the Hathigumpha inscription as Kharavela must be self identifying himself as an Aryan.

Religion 
The Hathigumpha inscription begins with a variation of the salute to arihants and siddhas. This is similar to the Jain Pancha-Namaskara Mantra, in which three more entities are invoked in addition to the arihants and siddhas. Other parts of the Hathigumpha inscription, as well as the minor inscriptions found at Udayagiri from around 1st-century BCE use Jain phrases. He is therefore generally called a Jain king. He brought back Jina idol from Mathura which was taken by Nanda king.

Some scholars such as Paul Dundas question whether he was a Jain, or another ancient king who supported Jainism and is valorized in an inscription written at a Jain site. One reason for doubts is that Hathigumpha inscription explicitly states he was a devotee of all religious sects (sava-pāsanḍa pūjako) and repaired temples dedicated to a variety of gods (sava-de[vāya]tana-sakāra-kārako). 

Other reasons to doubt Kharavela was a devout Jain is also found in many lines of the Hathigumpha inscription. The repeated mention of violence and wars in the inscription, says Dundas, raises questions whether Kharavela was merely partial to Jainism given the central doctrine of Ahimsa (non-violence) in Jainism.

According to Helmuth von Glasenapp, he was probably a free-thinker who patronized all his subjects (including Jains).

Biography 

According to the Hathigumpha inscription, Kharavela spent his first 24 years on education and sports, a period when he mastered the fields of writing, coinage, accounting, administration and procedures of law. He was the prince to the throne (yuvaraja) at 16, and crowned King of Kalinga at age 24. The Hathigumpha inscription details his first 13 years of his reign. Some notable aspects of this reign includes:

Succession 
Kulke and Rothermund state Kharavela's empire state that the history of ancient India is unclear including the times after Ashoka and Kharavela. Given the lack of major inscriptions by his successors, they surmise that the Kharavela empire likely disintegrated soon after his death. A little is known about the next two generations of kings - Vakradeva (a.k.a. Kudepasiri or Vakadepa) and Vadukha - but through the minor inscriptions at Udayagiri. Kharavela was succeeded by Sada dynasty kings. Siri Sada is mentioned as a Mahameghavahana king in an inscription at Guntupalli.

Legacy 
Kharavela's inscriptions call him a Chakravartin or an emperor. He was one of Kalinga's strongest rulers.

References

Citations

Sources
 ; For his updated analysis: B Barua (1938), Hathigumpha Inscription of Kharavela, Indian Historical Quarterly XIV, pp. 459-85
 
 

1st-century Indian monarchs
2nd-century Indian monarchs
History of Andhra Pradesh
History of Odisha
Mahameghavahana dynasty